The Canadian province of Nova Scotia first required its residents to register their motor vehicles in 1907. Registrants provided their own licence plates for display until 1918, when the province began to issue plates.

, plates are issued by the Nova Scotia Registry of Motor Vehicles. Only rear plates have been required since 1997.

Passenger baseplates

1918 to 1959
The first Nova Scotia licence plate that complied with these standards was issued fifteen years beforehand, in 1941.

No slogans were used on passenger plates during the period covered by this subsection.

1960 to present

Specialty plates

Non-passenger plates

Controversies

GRABHER License Plate
In 2017, Lorne Grabher of Nova Scotia had his custom license plate revoked. The plate displayed his last name 'GRABHER', which he had purchased as a gift for his father in the 1990s. He had received a letter saying his plate would be canceled as some had found his license plate to be misogynistic and offensive. Lorne attempted to keep his plate by fighting back in court, claiming it violated his right to freedom of expression. However, in August 2021 the Nova Scotia Court of Appeals ruled his constitutional rights had not been violated. They concluded the plate could not be used as it could be seen as offensive without the correct context. In 2022, the Supreme Court of Canada declined to hear an appeal of his case.

References

External links
Nova Scotia licence plates, 1969–present

1918 establishments in Nova Scotia
Nova Scotia
Transport in Nova Scotia
Nova Scotia-related lists